Gece (Turkish "night") may refer to:

Gece, 1972 Turkish film with Süleyman Turan List of Turkish films of 1972
Gece, 2014 Turkish film with Nurgül Yeşilçay
Gece (band)
Gece Yolcuları (literally "Night Riders" or "Night Travelers") Turkish soft rock band